The Hornblower Niagara Funicular, previously called the Maid of the Mist Incline and originally known as the Clifton Incline, was a funicular railway in the city of Niagara Falls, Ontario, Canada. The line was built to convey patrons of the Maid of the Mist boat tour, and linked the foot of Clifton Hill to the boat dock below.

The line was built as the Clifton Incline in 1894. The track splits near the bottom to allow for cars to pass. A station is located near the top of the incline. The line was renamed as the Maid of the Mist Incline in 1973, without any change to the method of operation or capacity.

The increasing size of the vessels used on the Maid of the Mist tour meant that more capacity was required, and the line was rebuilt between 1976 and 1977. When it reopened, it was served by new 24-seater cars which made the journey in 45 seconds. However even these proved inadequate for traffic, and the line finally closed in 1990 when it was replaced by a set of four elevators. Although the line closed in 1990 (replaced by elevators from the main entrance above) and became somewhat overgrown, both the track and the 1977 cars remained for decades afterwards.

After several years of construction, Hornblower Niagara Cruises reopened the incline for the 2019 season as the Hornblower Niagara Funicular to enable more traffic to the boat tour. The new system was built by AnCam Solutions Company Limited of Oakville, Ontario and Heller Manus of San Francisco. The new incline uses the same foundation and substructure of the original incline but with new, climate-controlled cars, and operates alongside the elevators.

See also
 Incline railways at Niagara Falls
 List of funicular railways

References

1976 disestablishments
Railway lines closed in 1990
Defunct Ontario railways
Funicular railways in Canada
Defunct funicular railways
Railway lines opened in 1894
Railway lines opened in 1977
Transport in Niagara Falls, Ontario
1850 mm gauge railways in Canada